Sphallambyx is a genus of beetles in the family Cerambycidae, containing the following species:

 Sphallambyx chabrillacii (Thomson, 1857)
 Sphallambyx mexicanum Galileo & Martins, 2006
 Sphallambyx superbum (Aurivillius, 1910)

References

Cerambycini